Lambula malayana is a moth of the family Erebidae. It was described by Jeremy Daniel Holloway in 1982. It is found in Malaysia.

References

 

Lithosiina
Moths described in 1982